Christian Jensen Morup (4 November 1732 – 27 April 1800) Was a Danish architect who primarily worked at Jutland during the 1700s.

Biography
Mørup was born  at Nørup  in South Jutland and died  in Ødum in East Jutland. Christian Mørup's parents were copyholders at Engelsholm Castle and his father a master builder. Mørup was taught the masonry craft by his father and was later educated in architectural drawing and planning by Nicolaus Hinrich Rieman.

In 1760, the master builder of Bidstrup Manor died and Mørup was tasked with finishing the project. The following year he designed an extension for Aarhus Cathedral School which is today known as the White Building. The extension was extensively altered in 1847 when it was given an additional floor and a neoclassical appearance. In 1780 Mørup built Randers City hall which may be his best known work and which was protected as a listed building in 1918. In 1795, he was the builder of a rebuilding of St Martin's Church, Randers.

Christian Jensen Mørup worked in a dated Baroque style with some newer elements such as the lesene-arch framing the porch portal in Bidstrup Church which can be found in all his later works. Randers City Hall also has elements thought to be inspired by works by Niels Eigtved.

Selected works 
 Finished Bidstrup Manor, 1760
 Aarhus Cathedral School, "White building", 1761, later remodeled.
 Tower for Gråbrødre Kloster, Viborg, 1761
 Plasterwork on Ulstrup Castle, 1766–67
 Plasterwork in Clausholm Castle, 1769
 Renovation of Søby Church choir, 1769–70
 Renovation of Linå Convent at Silkeborg, 1774
 Randers City Hall, 1778
 West tower on St. Morten's Convent at Randers
 Hospital in Grønbæk, 1770s
 Renovation of Hinge Convent, 1779
 Lemming Convent, 1784
 Sejling Convent, 1788
 Svostrup Convent, 1788
 Farm buildings at Mattrup Manor, 1764
 Tyrsting Convent, 1767

References

External links 

1732 births
1800 deaths
Danish architects